Kfm 94.5 is an adult contemporary radio station based in Cape Town, South Africa

Format and Programming 

Kfm 94.5 plays an Adult Contemporary format, with talk during the morning. The station is also affiliated with Eyewitness News, which provides news, along with sport and local events..

The station target listeners in the 25 to 49 age group living in the Western Cape. Kfm's reception area includes the metropolitan area of Cape Town and towns such as Mossel Bay, George, Knysna, Hermanus, Caledon, Worcester, Malmesbury, Saldanha and Beaufort West
. The reception area includes the West Coast as far as Alexander Bay and parts of the Northern Cape and even as far as the Eastern Cape in Graaf Reinet. Kfm delivers local news and traffic around Cape Town with  their affiliate Eyewitness News, as well as other regular inserts of news, sport and traffic.

LeadSA 

Kfm promotes LeadSA, a Primedia Broadcasting initiative. LeadSA promotes ordinary citizens to take pride in, and contribute to their country.

Presenters & Crew

News, Sports & Finance

 Chanel September 
 Anthea Fredericks
 Cato Louw

Broadcast time
 24/7

Listenership figures

See also
947
 Primedia
702
CapeTalk

References

External links
 Kfm's official website
 Lead SA's official website
 SAARF Website
Broadcast Research Council of South Africa 
 Sentech Website
 94.5 Kfm Live Stream + songs played

 

Radio stations in Cape Town
Radio stations established in 1973